Baraban may refer to:
Barabàn, an Italian folk music group
Baraban (drum)
Ivan Baraban, Croatian professional footballer
Baraban, Kursk Oblast, Russia
Baraban, Perm Krai, Russia